Sycanus is a genus of assassin bug with many species that are found in the African and Asian region.

Partial species list
Species in the genus include
 Sycanus affinis Reuter, 1881
 Sycanus albofasciatus Bergroth, 1908
 Sycanus ater (Wolff, 1802)
 Sycanus atrocoerulens Signoret, 1862
 Sycanus bifidus (Fabricius, 1787)
 Sycanus collaris (Fabricius, 1785)
 Sycanus croceovittatus Dohrn, 1959
 Sycanus dubius Paiva, 1919
 Sycanus falleni Stal, 1863
 Sycanus galbanus Distant, 1906
 Sycanus indagator Stal, 1863
 Sycanus inermis Distant, 1902
 Sycanus pyrrhomelas Walker, 1873
 Sycanus reclinatus Stal Dorn, 1859
 Sycanus rubicratus Stal, 1874
 Sycanus ventralis Distant, 1919
 Sycanus versicolor Dohrn, 1859
 Sycanus vividus Distant, 1919

References

Reduviidae
Insects of Africa
Insects of Asia